The Alpine A521, is a Formula One car designed by the Alpine F1 Team which competed in the 2021 Formula One World Championship. It was driven by Fernando Alonso, marking his return to the sport, and Esteban Ocon. It was the first to be fielded under the team's Alpine name.

Livery 
The car was run in French blue with a French flag pattern towards the rear. Alpine ran a special livery for the Saudi Arabian Grand Prix to commemorate their 100th race with one of their sponsors Castrol. During the first practice session in the Abu Dhabi Grand Prix, Alpine's name in the rear wing of both cars was replaced by the phrase "El Plan" (Spanish for "the plan"), referencing an internet meme created by Alonso's fans in the wake of his return to Formula One.

Complete Formula One results 
(key)

Notes
 Driver failed to finish the race, but was classified as they had completed over 90% of the winner's race distance.
 Half points awarded as less than 75% of race distance completed.

References

External links 
Alpine F1 Team official website

A521